Chrysoritis aethon, the Lydenburg opal, is a butterfly of the family Lycaenidae. It is found in South Africa, where it is known from northern KwaZulu-Natal to Mpumalanga, along the Drakensberg escarpment to Mariepskop in Limpopo.

The wingspan is 24–28 mm for males and 28–32 mm for females. Adults are on wing from September to April, with peaks in November and February. There are several generations per year.

The larvae feed on Rhus zeyheri and Diospyros species. They are attended to by Crematogaster liengmei ants.

References

aethon
Endemic butterflies of South Africa
Butterflies described in 1887
Taxa named by Roland Trimen